Annabel Tollman (March 7, 1974 – June 5, 2013) was a Belgian-British-American fashion journalist and editor of Interview magazine.

Early life 
Tollman was born in Brussels, Belgium, where her family moved to London and later Western New York.

Career 
She was a stylist and fashion director of a Bravo reality series.  Among her clients were Scarlett Johansson, Mariah Carey, and Mary-Kate and Ashley Olsen  In 2011, The Hollywood Reporter placed her at 21 in its list of the 25 most powerful stylists in Hollywood.  She was also the stylist and spokeswoman for eBay fashion.

In 2010, she was voted one of the 50 most stylish New Yorkers by StyleCaster.

Death 
In June 2013, at age 39, Tollman died in her sleep, reportedly from a blood clot.

References

External links
http://annabeltollman.com/home.html
http://www.huffingtonpost.com/annabel-tollman

1974 births
2013 deaths
Belgian editors
Fashion editors
Fashion journalists
Participants in American reality television series
Journalists from Brussels
Writers from New York (state)
Fashion stylists
Belgian women journalists
Belgian magazine editors
Women magazine editors
Deaths from blood clot